The Deutsche Wasserball-Liga (DWL) is the premier category in the league system for water polo clubs in Germany.

The men's championship was founded in 1912, but only two editions took place. It was resumed in 1919 and has taken place regularly since except for 1935, 1944 and 1945. Four-times European champions WF Spandau 04 has dominated the championship for the past three decades, with a record 37 titles since 1979.

The women's championship was founded in 1982. Blau-Weiss Bochum is its leading team, having won all editions from 2000 to 2011. Hohenlimburger SV and SG Neukölln were the main forces in previous years with six titles each.

List of champions

Men's championship
 WF Spandau 04 (37)
 1979, 1980, 1981, 1982, 1983, 1984, 1985, 1986, 1987, 1988, 1989, 1990, 1991, 1992, 1994, 1995, 1996, 1997, 1998, 1999, 2000, 2001, 2002, 2003, 2004, 2005, 2007, 2008, 2009, 2010, 2011, 2012, 2014, 2015, 2016, 2017, 2019
 Rote Erde Hamm (11)
 1954, 1955, 1956, 1959, 1960, 1964, 1966, 1969, 1971, 1972, 1975
 WF 98 Hannover (8)
 1921, 1922, 1923, 1927, 1936, 1937, 1938, 1948
 Hellas Magdeburg (8)
 1924, 1925, 1926, 1928, 1929, 1930, 1931, 1933
 Duisburger SV 98 (7)
 1939, 1940, 1941, 1952, 1958, 1961, 1962
 ASC Duisburg (6)
 1957, 1963, 1965, 1967, 1968, 2013
 SV Würzburg 05 (5)
 1970, 1974, 1976, 1977, 1978
 SSF Barmen (4)
 1947, 1949, 1950, 1951
 Waspo 98 Hannover (4)
 2018, 2020, 2021, 2022
 Germania 1887 Berlin
 1912, 1913
 Weissensee 96
 1932, 1934
 1. Frankfurter SV
 1919 
 Nikar Heidelberg
 1920
 Luftwaffen SV Berlin
 1942
 1. Wiener Amateur SV
 1943
 Bayern Nürnberg
 1953
 Waspo Hannover-Linden
 1993
 SV Cannstatt
 2006

Women's championship
 Blau-Weiss Bochum
 2000, 2001, 2002, 2003, 2004, 2005, 2006, 2007, 2008, 2009, 2010, 2011
 Hohenlimburger SV
 1983, 1984, 1987, 1991, 1997, 1999
 SG Neukölln
 1986, 1988, 1989, 1990, 1995, 1998
 SV Grönau
 1993, 1996
 SSC Südwest 1947
 1985
 Delphin Wüppertal
 1992
 Bayer Uerdingen
 1994
 Poseidon Köln
 1982

2011-12 teams

Men's championship
 Bayer Uerdingen
 ASC Duisburg
 SGW Hannover
 OSC Potsdam
 WF Spandau 04
 Wedding Berlin
 SV Weiden
 SV Würzburg 05

Women's championship
 Bayer Uerdingen
 Blau-Weiss Bochum
 SC Chemnitz
 FS Duisburg
 ETV Hamburg
 Hannoverscher SV
 SV Hohenlimburg
 SG Neukölln
 Nikar Heidelberg

References

Liga
Ger
Wasserball